is a Japanese surname. Notable people with the surname include:

, Japanese swordsman
, Japanese stunt man
, Japanese drummer and vocalist
, Japanese wrestler
, Japanese actress, voice actress and singer
, Japanese welterweight shoot boxer

Fictional characters:
, a character from The Prince of Tennis
 Tomi Shishido, a character from Marvel Comics Wolverine

See also
Shishido Domain
Shishido Station

Japanese-language surnames
ja:宍戸氏